Single-Handed Sanders is a 1932 American pre-Code Western film directed by Charles A. Post and starring Tom Tyler and Margaret Morris.

Cast
 Tom Tyler as Matt Sanders 
 Robert Seiter as Phillip Sanders 
 Margaret Morris as Alice Parker 
 John Elliott as Senator Graham 
Gordon De Main as Judge Parker 
 Fred 'Snowflake' Toones as Snowflake
 Loie Bridge as Mrs. Perkins 
 Hank Bell as Hank Perkins

References

Bibliography
 Martin, Len D. The Allied Artists Checklist: The Feature Films and Short Subjects of Allied Artists Pictures Corporation, 1947-1978. McFarland & Company, 1993.

External links
 

1932 films
1932 Western (genre) films
American Western (genre) films
Films directed by Charles A. Post
American black-and-white films
Monogram Pictures films
1930s English-language films
1930s American films